The 2009–10 LEB season is the 14th season of the Liga Española de Baloncesto. The 612-game regular season (34 games for each of the 18 teams) began in September 2009, and ended in June 2010. The champion of the regular season will be promoted to ACB. The teams between 2nd and 9th position will play a best of 5 games play-off, where the winner will be promoted to ACB. The 18th team will be relegated to LEB Plata and the teams 16th and 17th will play a best of 5 games play-out. The loser, will be relegated.

Regular season

LEB Oro Playoffs

Relegation play-out

CB Cornellà is relegated to 2010-11 LEB Plata, but due to financial problems, they will play Liga EBA.

Stats leaders in the regular season

Points

Rebounds

Assists

Efficiency

MVP week by week

External links
Spanish Basketball Federation

LEB Oro seasons
LEB2
Second level Spanish basketball league seasons